The Girl Guides Association of Belize is the national Guiding organization of Belize. It serves 412 members as of 2006. Founded in 1937, the girls-only organization became an associate member of the World Association of Girl Guides and Girl Scouts in 1987 and a full member in 1993.

See also

References

Scouting and Guiding in Belize
World Association of Girl Guides and Girl Scouts member organizations
youth organizations established in 1937